Mir Kuh-e Sofla (also Romanized as Mīr Kūh-e Soflá; also known as Mīr Kūh-e Ḩājjī) is a village in Razliq Rural District, in the Central District of Sarab County, East Azerbaijan Province, Iran. At the 2006 census, its population was 87, in 23 families.

References 

Populated places in Sarab County